Faded Gloryville is the fourth full-length album released by Lindi Ortega on Last Gang Records imprint Grand Tour Records August 7, 2015.

Ortega recorded Faded Gloryville in spurts, splitting the workload between three different producers. Dave Cobb, who'd sat behind the boards for Tin Star, recorded three songs at the Sound Emporium in Nashville, while Colin Linden, the producer of Ortega's 2012 release, Cigarettes & Truckstops, recorded four. Rounding out the sessions were three songs tracked in Muscle Shoals, including a Nina Simone-inspired update of the Bee Gees classic "To Love Somebody."

Track listing
 "Ashes" (Linda Ortega, James Robertson) 4:35
 "Faded Gloryville" (Ortega) 3:12
 "Tell It Like It Is" (Ortega) 3:46
 "Someday Soon" (Ortega, John Paul White) 3:36
 "To Love Somebody" (Barry Gibb, Robin Gibb) 3:27
 "When You Ain't Home" (Ortega, Brice Long) 3:41
 "Run-Down Neighborhood" (Ortega, Bruce Wallace) 3:07
 "I Ain't The Girl" (Ortega) 3:25
 "Run Amuck" (Ortega, Tofer Brown) 4:19
 "Half Moon" (Ortega, Dan Brigham, Trent Dabbs) 3:22

Personnel
Brian Allen- bass guitar
Rob Alley- trumpet
Dave Cobb- acoustic guitar
Jason "Rowdy" Cope- electric guitar
Gary Craig- drums, percussion
John Dymond- bass guitar
Caleb Elliott- cello
Jeremy Fetzer- electric guitar
Chad Fisher- trombone
Ian Fitchuk- organ
Jeremy Gibson- drums, percussion
David Hood- bass guitar
Colin Linden- acoustic guitar, electric guitar
Lindi Ortega- lead vocals, background vocals
Bryan Owings- drums, percussion
Chris Powell- drums, percussion
James Robertson- electric guitar
Kimi Samson- violin
Ben Tanner- keyboards
John Paul White- acoustic guitar, background vocals

Chart performance
The album debuted at No. 39 on the Top Country Albums chart, selling 1,300 copies in the US.

References

2015 albums
Lindi Ortega albums
Albums produced by Dave Cobb